The Gibraltar Cycling Association (GCA) is the governing body for bicycle racing in the British overseas territory of Gibraltar.

The national governing body for the territory is British Cycling in the United Kingdom. The current head of the GCA is Chris Nuñez.

See also
 Sport in Gibraltar

References 

Cycle racing organizations
Cycle racing in Gibraltar
Cycling